was a Japanese writer and actress, known for her science fiction stories and essays on Japanese pop culture. Married to avant-garde saxophonist Kaoru Abe until his death from overdose, she is also known for her association with photographer Nobuyoshi Araki.

Life

Suzuki was born in Itō, Shizuoka in 1949. Her father Eiji Suzuki was a reporter for the Yomiuri Shimbun. After graduating from Shizuoka Prefectural Itō High School in 1968, she worked briefly as a keypunch operator at Itō City Hall. In 1969 she was selected as a runner-up for the New Writers' Award administered by the monthly literary magazine Shōsetsu Gendai and moved to Tokyo, where she found work as a hostess, nude model, and actor. 

Though her acting career was brief, Suzuki's work was varied, and she appeared in both pink films and on stage, as a member of Tenjō Sajiki, the avant-garde theater troupe co-founded by Shūji Terayama. Suzuki appeared in Tenjō Sajiki's 1970 play 人力飛行機ソロモン The Man-powered Plane Solomon, and in January 1971 the troupe presented "Izumi Suzuki's Avant-Garde Theater Week," during which they staged her plays ある種の予感 A Kind of Premonition and マリィは待っている Marie is Waiting. That same year she accompanied Tenjō Sajiki to Paris and Amsterdam. In 1970, she was shortlisted for the Bungakukai Prize for New Writers, and from 1971 devoted herself to writing. In 1975, thanks to an introduction from the science fiction author Taku Mayumura, she published her first sci-fi short story, "Trial Witch," in S-F Magazine. She had initially met Mayumura when she made an appearance on the late-night television program 11PM in 1970, during which he suggested she try reading science fiction.

Suzuki married avant-garde saxophonist Kaoru Abe in 1973, with whom she had a daughter, Azusa, in April 1976. Azusa did not come to live with Suzuki until the early 80s, however, and in the interim was raised instead by Suzuki's family in Shizuoka. In 1977 Suzuki divorced Abe (though they continued to live together), and he died a year later from an accidental overdose of Bromisoval. For a time she managed to support her daughter by publishing stories in sci-fi magazines, but eventually her health deteriorated and she began receiving public assistance. 

Suzuki's tumultuous marriage to Abe was the subject of Endless Waltz, a 1992 novel by Mayumi Inaba, which prompted Suzuki's orphaned daughter to sue Inaba for invasion of privacy. In 1995, the novel was adapted for film by Kōji Wakamatsu, an exponent of the pink film genre who directed Suzuki in his 1970 film Violence Without a Cause.

Japanese photographer Nobuyoshi Araki took portraits of Suzuki throughout her career. These photographs were compiled after her death in a photograph collection titled Izumi,this bad girl. Araki's portraits of Suzuki have also been used on covers of Japanese reissues of her works as well as English translations of her stories.

In 1986, Suzuki committed suicide at the age of thirty-six by hanging herself at home. The timing of her death is a preoccupation of "The Unfertilized Egg," a short story by Junko Hasegawa, in which the main character, Moriko, who is also thirty-six, is haunted by the fact that Suzuki, Princess Diana and Marilyn Monroe all died at the same age, before their beauty or their powers waned.

Writing

Suzuki belongs to the "Second Generation" of SF writers active in the 1970s, who broke free from the influence of American science fiction and developed an irreverent style all their own. Critic and scholar Takayuki Tatsumi calls Suzuki an "originator of the 'Sf of Manners,' who makes the most of her well-developed camp sensibility." SF critic Nozomi Ōmori, a translator of Ted Chiang and Rudy Rucker, has described her 1982 story "Hey, It's a Love Psychadelic!" as a forerunner of cyberpunk.

Acting

Suzuki appeared in a number of pink films in 1970 under the name Naomi Asaka, beginning with her debut, A Virgin at Play. That same year she appeared in Violence Without a Cause, directed by Kōji Wakamatsu, and in the film adaptation of George Akiyama's controversial manga Zeni Geba, which was directed by Yoshinori Wada. Her only film appearance after 1971's Throw Away Your Books, Rally in the Streets, directed by Shūji Terayama, appears to have been a 52-minute 16mm film called 家獣 House Beast, which was directed by Teiji Aoyama and released in 1979. The film has not been screened since the 1980s, however, and may be lost.

Selected bibliography

Japanese
愛するあなた The One I Love, Gendaihyōronsha, 1973
あたしは天使じゃない I'm No Angel, Buronzusha, 1973
残酷メルヘン Cruel Fairytale, Seigashobō, 1975
女と女の世の中 Women and Women, Hayakawa Bunko, 1978
いつだってティータイム Teatime Any Time, Byakuyashobō, 1978
感触 Touch, Kosaido Publishing, 1980
恋のサイケデリック! A Love Psychedelic, Hayakawa Bunko, 1982
ハートに火をつけて! だれが消す Set Your Heart on Fire, San-Ichi Shobō, 1983
鈴木いづみプレミアム・コレクション Izumi Suzuki: The Premium Collection, Bunyūsha, 2006
契約 鈴木いづみSF全集 Covenant: The Complete SF of Izumi Suzuki, Bunyūsha, 2014

English
Terminal Boredom, Verso Books, 2021 (short stories)
Hit Parade of Tears, Verso Books, 2023 (short stories)

Selected filmography

As Naomi Asaka
処女の戯れ A Virgin at Play (Million Film) 1970
売春暴行白書・性暴力を斬る White Paper on the Violation of Prostitutes: Sexual Violence (Million Film) 1970
女性の性徴期 A Woman's Sexual Development (Million Film) 1970
絶妙の女 The Perfect Woman (Kantō Movies) 1970
情炎・女護ヶ島 Burning Passion: The Isle of Women (Kantō Movies) 1970
理由なき暴行 現代性犯罪絶叫篇 Violence Without a Cause: The Scream of Modern Sex Crimes (Wakamatsu Productions) 1970

As Izumi Suzuki
銭ゲバ Zeni Geba（Kindai Hōei) 1970
書を捨てよ街へ出よう Throw Away Your Books, Rally in the Streets (Art Theater Guild/Jinriki Hikōki) 1971

References

Notes

See also 
 Japanese science fiction
 Kaoru Abe
 Kōji Wakamatsu
 Pink film

External links
 "Museum of Izumi Suzuki" gallery of works by Izumi Suzuki (Japanese)
 "The Walker" by Izumi Suzuki (trans. Daniel Joseph)
 Izumi entry in The Encyclopedia of Science Fiction

1949 births
1986 deaths
Japanese essayists
20th-century Japanese novelists
20th-century Japanese short story writers
20th-century essayists
20th-century Japanese women writers
Japanese women short story writers
Japanese women novelists
1986 suicides
Suicides by hanging in Japan